Monophyllorchis is a monotypic genus of flowering plants from the orchid family, Orchidaceae. The sole species is Monophyllorchis microstyloides, native to Costa Rica, Nicaragua, Colombia and Ecuador.

See also
 List of Orchidaceae genera

References

 Schlechter, F.R.R.(1920) Repertorium Specierum Novarum Regni Vegetabilis, Beihefte 7: 39.
 Pridgeon, A.M., Cribb, P.J., Chase, M.C. & Rasmussen, F.N. (2005). Epidendroideae (Part One). Genera Orchidacearum 4: 609 ff. Oxford University Press
 Berg Pana, H. 2005. Handbuch der Orchideen-Namen. Dictionary of Orchid Names. Dizionario dei nomi delle orchidee. Ulmer, Stuttgart

External links

Triphorinae
Orchids of South America
Orchids of Central America
Monotypic Epidendroideae genera
Triphoreae genera